Fairmont Nile City is a hotel located in Cairo, Egypt and is a part of the global Fairmont Hotels and Resorts brand. The hotel has 531 rooms, 8 restaurants, and 25 floors and is located alongside the Nile River.

About the hotel 
Fairmont Nile City opened on October 6, 2010, with Nile City Investment being one of the property's main shareholders. The building is 105 meters high and was designed by architectural firm, Hirsch Bedner Associates. Since the hotel opening, it has been under continuous retouching across the property. The hotel features mainly Art Deco and contemporary design features within its overall interior decoration style.  It is situated between the two towers of the Nile City Complex. It is also located about 23 km away from tourist attractions including the Giza pyramid complex, the Great Sphinx of Giza, and the Mosque of Muhammad Ali.

Food & beverage outlets
Fairmont Nile City has 7 food & beverage outlets on the property. These include 
 Bab El Nil: Restaurant with Asian cuisine located on hotel terrace. Each table includes traditional games such as chess, cards, and backgammon. Shisha is offered at Bab El Nil as well. 
 Napa Grill: Located on the second floor of the hotel, this casual restaurant features cuisine included by California, Spanish, Mediterranean, and Mexican dishes. 
 Saigon Restaurant & Lounge: Asian fusion restaurant and lounge featuring live jazz music.
 Onyx Lounge: Lobby lounge with light snacks, dessert, and a coffee & tea menu.
 Sky Pool: Rooftop pool and restaurant area with hot and cold dishes, cocktails, and alcohol-free cocktails.
 Champagne Bar: Hotel bar offering cocktails, wine, and spirits with an emphasis on local Asian flavors
 O Bar: Live-entertainment bar with a full drink menu and cigar menu.

Awards
Fairmont Nile City has won a variety of hospitality –related awards including 
 Trip Advisor's “Certificate of Excellence” (2012, 2013, 2014) 
 Trip Advisor Traveler's Choice Awards (2012, 2013, 2014) 
 International Hotel Awards – Highly Commended Best Hotel in Egypt
 2012 International Hotel Awards – Highly Commended Leisure Interior Egypt  
 2012 International Hotel Awards – Highly Commended Leisure Interior Egypt  
 Booking.com Guest Review Award

Hotel partnerships
The hotel has paired with a variety of other organizations including American Express, British Airways, HSBC seasonal offers, Travel Industry Association of Canada, and Visa card – Signature & Platinum. It has also hosted a variety of art projects and events including Earth Hour, a rooftop event with live acoustic music and presentations from environmental expert speakers. It also joined The Canadian Embassy and the Children's Cancer Hospital in Egypt to host the Terry Fox Run in 2010.

In 2015, Fairmont stated it would invest in two new hotels in Egypt, in addition to its existing hotel located in Cairo.

Facilities
The hotel is home to the Willow Stream Spa, the signature Fairmont spa and one of the largest spas in Egypt. It includes a health club and various spa treatments. The hotel also has a rooftop pool and lounge, Sky Pool, at the top of the property.

Notoriety
The Fairmont Nile City has been location for various movie and TV shoots including Gabel El Halal, Baba, Relam, and more. Some of the hotel's famous guests include Lucy Liu, Samuel L. Jackson, and Salma Hayek.

The hotel is infamous for the 2014 Cairo hotel gang rape case, in which a young woman was gangraped by several men from wealthy families. Three of the accused were extradited from Lebanon back to Egypt for trial in September 2020.

References

Hotels in Cairo
Fairmont Hotels and Resorts
Hotel buildings completed in 2010
Hotels established in 2010
21st-century architecture in Egypt